Gizhiga is a rural locality (a selo) in Severo-Evensky District of Magadan Oblast, Russia, located at the head of Gizhigin Bay of the Sea of Okhotsk, on the right bank of the Gizhiga just upstream from its mouth where there is a poor but usable harbor. Population: 288 (2012 est.).

History
Gizhiga was an important place in the first half of the 19th century. It was founded in 1752 along with Tigilsky to protect the land route from Okhotsk to the Kamchatka Peninsula from the rebellious Koryaks whose hostility had blocked the route since 1743. Gizhiga and Tigilsky were the only two places on the Sea of Okhotsk to have the status of a krepost (fortress). No grain was grown but there were a few vegetable gardens. People ate mostly fish. Sled dogs were used and a team of dogs ate as much fish as twenty men. About 63–108 tons of grain were imported from Okhotsk annually. Prices were about twice as high as in Okhotsk. The ships returned with mostly furs. When Kennan was there in 1866, Gizhiga dominated the trade in the area between Okhotsk and Anadyrsk. There were fifty or sixty log houses, a governor, and four or five merchants. It was visited annually by a government supply steamer and by American merchant vessels.

Demographics

References

Notes

Sources
George Kennan, "Tent Life in Siberia", 1870 and numerous reprints.
James R Gibson, "Feeding the Russian Fur Trade", 1969

Rural localities in Magadan Oblast
Populated coastal places in Russia
Sea of Okhotsk
Ports and harbours of the Russian Pacific Coast
1752 establishments in the Russian Empire